Jam (also romanized as Jamm; also known as Jām-e Jam) is a city in the Central District of Jam County, Bushehr province, Iran, and serves as capital of the county. At the 2006 census, its population was 10,809 in 2,734 households. The following census in 2011 counted 16,313 people in 4,632 households. The latest census in 2016 showed a population of 31,436 people in 9,356 households.

It has an airport close to the city and has recently seen a boom  as large growth in population and construction work for the petrochemical industry due to the oil boom and the relatively close PSEEZ (Pars Special Energy Economic Zone).                                   Many people in Bahrain have ancestors from most people from Jam are  Shia Muslim and they speak a special dialect of Persian, known as Ajmi.

Sports
Jam's main sport team is Pars Jonubi Jam football club who used to play in the Azadegan League and now in Persian Gulf Pro League, Iranian Premier League.

References 

Cities in Bushehr Province
Populated places in Jam County